Rhotacization  may refer to:
 R-colored vowels
 Rhotacism (sound change), conversion of a consonant into an r sound